Earthtones may refer to:

 Earthtones (Bahamas album)
 Earthtones (Crown City Rockers album)
 Earth tones